Exellodendron is a genus of plant in the family Chrysobalanaceae described as a genus in 1972.

The entire genus Exellodendron is native to South America.

Species
 Exellodendron barbatum (Ducke) Prance - Bolívar, Guyana, Suriname, French Guiana, Brazil (Amazonas, Maranhão, Pará)
 Exellodendron cordatum (Hook.f.) Prance - NE Brazil
 Exellodendron coriaceum (Benth.) Prance - Venezuela (Amazonas, Bolívar),  Guyana,  Brazil (Amazonas, Roraima, Pará)
 Exellodendron gardneri (Hook.f.) Prance - Brazil (Rondônia, Bahia, Goiás)
 Exellodendron gracile (Kuhlm.) Prance - Brazil (Espírito Santo)

References

Chrysobalanaceae
Chrysobalanaceae genera